Mourad Kaouah (1919-1989) was a French politician and football player. He served as the deputy of Algiers from 1958 to 1962. Thus, he was the only French Muslim deputy at the time. Kaouah was also a member of the right-wing French National Front party. 
However, his candidacy was unsuccessful in the 1984 elections.

A room in the Cercle Algérianiste Museum in Perpignan is named in his honour.

Personal life
Kaouah was born in Aumale, France, to an Algerian family of Ottoman Turkish origin.

He died in Perpignan.

References

1919 births
1989 deaths
People from Seine-Maritime
20th-century Algerian people
Algerian people of Turkish descent
French people of Algerian descent
French people of Turkish descent
National Rally (France) politicians
French sportspeople of Algerian descent